Richard Walker (1501–1567)was an English  priest in the 16th century.

Walker was born in Lichfield and educated at Lichfield Grammar School and Jesus College, Cambridge. He was appointed Archdeacon of Stafford in 1547, Archdeacon of Derby in 1549; and Dean of Chester in 1560.

Notes

1501 births
People from Lichfield
1567 deaths
16th-century English people
Deans of Chester
Archdeacons of Stafford
Archdeacons of Derby